Lips of Lurid Blue (also known as With Lips of Lurid Blue and With Lips of Filthy Blue) is a 1975  erotic drama film written and directed by  Giulio Petroni.

Plot 
Traumatised when they were children - she by the erotic effusions of her parents, he by a repulsive experience of sexual initiation built by the fathers - Elli has become a nymphomaniac, and Marco a homosexual. Perhaps to find a way out from their deviations, perhaps to support each other, the two marry. Their marriage, however, does not solve their problems, nor are things made any easier by the unexpected return of George, the English antiquarian "friend" of Marco, who now tries to seduce Marco.  Marco kills the girl who loves him, whom he has rejected, and then throws himself from a tower, under the eyes of Elli and George.

Cast 

Lisa Gastoni as Elli Alessi
Corrado Pani as  Marco
Jeremy Kemp as  George Stevens, Marco's Lover
Pino Caruso as Don Gino
Hélène Chanel as Elli's Mother
Silvano Tranquilli as David Levi
 Daniela Halbritter as Laura 
Gino Santercole as Alberto

References

External links

Italian erotic drama films
1970s erotic drama films
Films directed by Giulio Petroni
Films scored by Ennio Morricone
1975 drama films
1975 films
1970s Italian films
1970s Italian-language films